Bilquis Khanum, also known as Nisho (Urdu; نشو۔; born 1954) is a Pakistani film actress.

Early life
Bilquis Begum was born on 1954 in Gujrat, Punjab, Pakistan. She completed her studies from University of Punjab.

Career
In the beginning, Nisho did theatre at school. She made her big screen debut in the film Baazi in 1970. She moved to Karachi, she worked in Lollywood movies. She appeared in films Rangeela, Tiger Gang, Roop Behroop, Bazigar, Yaar Des Punjab Day, Yeh Aman. After the success of her movies she changed her name to Nisho. Later she appeared in films with Waheed Murad and Nadeem Baig. She also sang songs in movies written by her husband Tasleem Fazli, a celebrated poet. Nisho also appeared in movies Zalim Tay Mazloom, Namak Harram, Phool Meray Gulshan Ka and Neelaam.

Personal life
Nisho first married her class-fellow Anaam Rabbani, but later divorced him. Then she was married to songwriter and poet Tasleem Fazli. Nisho's husband died in August 17th, 1982. After his death, Nisho married director Jamal Pasha. She has two children actress Sahiba Afzal and singer Hamza Pasha. Nisho's daughter Sahiba is married to actor Afzal Khan.

Filmography

Television

Film

References

External links
 

1954 births
Living people
Actresses in Pashto cinema
20th-century Pakistani actresses
Pakistani film actresses
Actresses in Punjabi cinema
Pakistani television actresses
Punjabi people
21st-century Pakistani actresses
Actresses in Urdu cinema